The Dominion Rules Licence (or DRL) is the open gaming licence under which the Dominion Rules role-playing game system is distributed. It is notable for being one of the earliest examples of an open gaming licence, predating the better known Open Game License.

Legal provisions 
The main rights granted by the DRL are (1) the right to distribute Dominion Rules, (2) the right to modify Dominion Rules, (3) the rights to create and distribute "Larger Works" and "Compatible Works".

The main right licensees grant under the DRL is the right of others to copy, modify and distribute any modifications to Dominion Rules a licensee makes.

These provisions resemble those found in many open-source licences.

Versions 
Version 1.1 of the DRL is the most prominent previous version. It was under this version of the DRL that Dominion Rules 2.0 was released in 2002.

The current version of the DRL is 2.0. It closely resembles version 1.1 but has been simplified in some respects. DRL v. 2.0 is the version under which Dominion Rules 3.0 was released in 2008.

References

Role-playing game systems
Free content licenses